Events from the year 1598 in Ireland.

Incumbent
Monarch: Elizabeth I

Events
 early June – Nine Years' War: Lord Treasurer Thomas Butler backs the claim of the exiled Tadhg O'Rourke for the kingship of West Breifne, causing King Brian Óg O'Rourke to defect back to the rebels.
 June 7 – Nine Years' War: The temporary ceasefire agreed between the Irish rebel lordships and the English in October 1597 expires.
August 14 – Nine Years' War: Hugh O'Neill, Earl of Tyrone's victory over an English expeditionary force under Henry Bagenal, at the Battle of the Yellow Ford.
October – Nine Years' War: Edmund Spenser's castle at Kilcolman, near Doneraile in North Cork, is burned down by O'Neill's native Irish forces. Spenser leaves for London shortly afterwards.

Births
Patrick D'Arcy, nationalist who wrote the constitution of Confederate Ireland (d. 1668).

Deaths
August 14 – Henry Bagenal, Marshal of Ireland, is killed at Yellow Ford.
August 14 – Maelmora O'Reilly, pretender to the kingship of East Breifne, is killed at Yellow Ford.

References

 
1590s in Ireland
Ireland
Years of the 16th century in Ireland